Rudravelly is a village in Nalgonda district in Telangana, India. It falls under Bibinagar mandal. Bhongir is 18 km from Rudravelly. Road connectivity is there from Bhongir to Rudravelly.

References

Villages in Nalgonda district